Leelawati Bhaskar Bhagwat was an editor and author of Marathi children's books.

References 

1920 births
2013 deaths
Indian children's writers
Indian editors
Marathi people